Beuchat International, better known as Beuchat, is a company that designs, manufactures and markets underwater equipment. It was established in 1934 in Marseille, France, by Georges Beuchat, who descended from a Swiss watchmaking family.

Georges Beuchat was an underwater pioneer who co-founded the French Underwater Federation in 1948. During its 75-year history, the company has deployed several different brand names, among them: "Pêche Sport", "Tarzan", "Beuchat", "Beuchat Sub" and "Beuchat International".

Georges Beuchat sold the company in 1982 to the Alvarez de Toledo family. The firm is now owned by the Margnat family, who took over in 2002. Beuchat is an international company. From the outset, Georges Beuchat extended his operations beyond the borders of France, selling his products worldwide. In the 1970s, he created the Beuchat swordfish logo, which can still be found on every product.

Business

Beuchat currently has 3 core ranges:
 Scuba diving: recreational diving, professional diving and military diving,
 Spearfishing and freediving,
 Snorkeling

Chronology

1934: Company founded in Marseille.
1947: Tarzan Speargun
1948: Surface Buoy
1950: Tarzan camera housing
1950: Tarzan calf sheath for diving knife.
1953: 1st Isothermic wetsuit.
1954: Split strap for diving mask.
1958: Compensator (single-window mask).
1959: Tarzan fin grips (3-way straps securing closed-heel fins on feet)
1960: Espadon Record fins with blades featuring parallel longitudinal ribs
1961: Export Award. Club subaquatique toulousain catalogue of Tarzan-Espadon equipment.
1963: Tarzan wetsuit
1964: Jetfins (1st vented fins. 100,000 units sold in the first few years). Souplair regulator release.
Mid-1960s: Pêche Sport catalogue.
Late 1960s: Beuchat & Co. catalogue.
1975: Marlin speargun
1978: Atmos regulator
1985: Lyfty ruff buoy
1986: Aladin computer distribution
1990: Cavalero purchasing
1993: Oceane buoy
1998: CX1, 1st French diving computer (Comex Algorithm, French Labor Ministry certified)
2001: Mundial Spearfishing fins
2007: Focea Comfort II wetsuit. Power Jet fins.
2008: BCD Masterlift Voyager
2009: VR 200 Evolution regulator. 75th brand anniversary. Anniversary wetsuit limited edition release.
2010: Marlin Revolution speargun - roller gun

Spearfishing

Ever since the company was established, Beuchat has manufactured spearfishing equipment, enabling spearfishers such as Pedro Carbonell, Sylvain Pioch, Pierre Roy, Ghislain Guillou and Vladimir Dokuchajev to gain numerous national and international titles.

Various

The Scubapro logo: "S" was adapted from the Beuchat "Souplair" regulator.

References

External links 

 Corporate website
 SpearoTek, Inc. - U.S. Distributor

Manufacturing companies established in 1934
Diving equipment manufacturers
Manufacturing companies based in Marseille
Military diving equipment
French brands
Diving engineering
French companies established in 1934